Pierpoint may refer to:

Places
Pierpoint, California, USA

People
Charles Pierpoint (1795-?), English athlete in cricket
Eric Pierpoint (born 1950), United States actor
Folliott Sandford Pierpoint (1835-1917), English hymnist and poet
Katherine Pierpoint (born 1961), English poet
Powell Pierpoint (1922-1998), United States lawyer, General Counsel of the Army
Richard Pierpoint (c1744-c1837), Bondu-born participant in the American Revolution
Robert Pierpoint (journalist) (1925-2011), United States broadcast journalist
Robert Pierpoint (Vermont politician) (1791-1864), United States political figure and co-founder of a life-insurance company
Roy Pierpoint (born 1929), British racing driver
Thomas Pierpoint (1789–1849), English cricketer

See also
Pierpont (disambiguation)
Pierrepoint (disambiguation)